Terranera  is a frazione of Rocca di Mezzo, in the Province of L'Aquila in the Abruzzo, region of Italy.

Frazioni of Rocca di Mezzo